Tsibi Geva (born 1951) is an Israeli educator and music/art critic. Geva's work is a cross between graffiti, sculpture and abstract expressionism.

Biography 
Tsibi Geva was born in 1951 in Kibbutz Ein Shemer, Israel. Geva lives and works in Tel Aviv and New York.

Since 1979, Geva has exhibited at the Israel Museum, Jerusalem (1984); the Institute of Contemporary Art, Boston (1985); the Tel Aviv Museum (1988); the Haifa Museum, Haifa (2003); the Tel Aviv Museum (2008); the American University Museum at the Katzen Arts Center, Washington, DC (2013); the MACRO Testaccio, Rome (2014) and the Mönchenhaus – Museum of Modern Art, Goslar (2015) and the Israeli Pavilion at the 56th Venice Biennale (2015).

Art career 
Geva's participation in international group exhibitions include the Kunsthaus Zürich Orangerie Herrenhausen, Hannover (1989);  The Jewish Museum, New York(1989), Whitebox, NY (2013); Royal Palace of Milan, Milan (2006); Martin-Gropius-Bau, Berlin (2005); El Espacio Aglutinador, Havana, Cuba (1998); The Israel Museum, Jerusalem (2012); Tel Aviv Museum of Art (2016); Museum on the Seam, Jerusalem (2010), Dehallen Belfort, Bruges Belgium (2006), and CCA Andratx, Mallorca (2010).

Geva's works are included in galleries and collections including The MoMA Collection, NY; The Jewish Museum, New York ; Rothfeld Collection, American University Museum, Washington DC; Museum on the Seam, Jerusalem; Tel Aviv Museum of Art; The Phoenix collection; Annina Nosei, NY; Arturo Schwartz, Italy; Donald Rothfeld, NY; Joshoua Gessel, Zurich; Michael Recanati, NY; Monique and Max Burger, Zurich.

Geva is a professor at the School of Visual Arts, MFA program, NY; the University of Haifa, and Hamidrasha School of Art, Beit Berl College, Israel.

Solo exhibitions 
1979 Tsibi Geva, Kibbutz Gallery, Tel Aviv
1979 Tsibi Geva, Sara Gilat Gallery, Jerusalem
1982 December 82, Kibbutz Gallery, Tel Aviv
1983 New Works, Sarah Gilat Gallery, Jerusalem
1984 Tsibi Geva, Julie M. Gallery Tel Aviv
1984 Tsibi Geva, Special Exhibition, The Israel Museum, Jerusalem
1984 Streams: Tsibi Geva, ICA, Boston
1985 Tsibi Geva, Julie M. Gallery Tel Aviv
1988 Tsibi Geva: Paintings, Tel Aviv Museum of Art
1989 Tsibi Geva, Julie M. Gallery. Tel Aviv
1990 Tsibi Geva, Anina Noosei Gallery, New York
1990 The Refuge and other paintings 1985–1988, Julie M. Gallery. Tel Aviv
1992 No, Julie M. Gallery. Tel Aviv, Bograshov Gallery, Tel Aviv
1993 Tsibi Geva, Anina Noosei Gallery, New York
1993 Blinds 1994, Julie M. Gallery Tel Aviv
1994 Tsibi Geva - Works 1988–1994, The Museum of Art, Ein Harod
1995 Tsibi Geva, Anina Nozay Gallery, New York
1995 The Great North Window of the Classroom, Julie M. Gallery. Tel Aviv
1997 Works, Julie M. Gallery Tel Aviv
1998 Tsibi Geva: December
1982 - December 1998, Kibbutz Gallery, Tel Aviv
1998 Caffé and Balata paintings, Ambrosino Gallery, Miami, Florida
1999 Kaffiyeh, Espacio Aglutinador, Havana, Cuba
1999 Summer, The Art Gallery of Kibbutz Beeri
2000 Works, Art Gallery, Kibbutz Rosh Hanikra
2001 High Holidays, Anina Noisy Gallery, New York
2001 Rage, Gallery Now, Berlin
2001 Gallery, Hagar Gallery, Jaffa
2001 The High Holidays, Tmuna Theater, Tel Aviv
2002 Background, Art Gallery, Kibbutz Kabri; Art Gallery of Kibbutz Lohamei Hagetaot
2003 Master Plan, Haifa Museum of Art, Haifa
2003 Birds of Our Country, 16th Line Gallery, Tel Aviv
2003 What Does the Bird Care About, Goren Art Gallery, Emek Yezreel Academic College
2004 Anina Noisy Gallery, New York
2005 After, Anina Noisy Gallery, New York
2006 Mount Analogue, The Midrasha Art Gallery, Tel Aviv
2006 Other Flowers, The New Gallery, Beit Gabriel on the Sea of Galilee
2007 Still Life, Armno Tedeschi Gallery, Rome
2008 Tel Devarim, Tel Aviv Museum of Art
2009 Biladi, Biladi - Works 1983–1985, Warehouse 2, Jaffa Port
2009 Inayach, Herzliya Museum of Art
2010 The Other Works, Pratt Gallery, Tel Aviv
2010 Song of the Land, San Galo Art Gallery, Florence
2010 Tsibi Geva - New Works, Anina Noisy Gallery, New York
2011 Tsibi Geva, Winners Two Thousand and Ten, Museum of Israeli Art, Ramat Gan
2011 Kaffiyeh, Artist Wall, Peres Center for Peace
2012 The bird inside is standing outside, Hyrcanus Orca, Messina, Sicily
2012 New Works, Studio in Alfasi, Tel Aviv
2012 Object, Crossing, Ashdod Museum of Art, Monart Center, Ashdod
2015 Exhibition, The Israeli Pavilion to the Biennale of Art, Venice

Awards 

 1984 - America-Israel Cultural Foundation, Sharett Scholarship for Continuing Education Abroad
 1985 - Koliner Prize for Young Artist, The Israel Museum, Jerusalem
 1994 - Prize of the Minister of Science and the Arts for Plastic Arts
 1996 - Isracard Prize for Art, Tel Aviv Museum of Art
 1997 - Sandberg Prize for Israeli Art, The Israel Museum, Jerusalem
 2001 - Jeanette and George Jaffin Prize, America-Israel Cultural Foundation
 2003 - The Haifa Museum of Art Prize
 2004 - Eva and Mendel Pundik Foundation Prize for Israeli Art, Tel Aviv Museum of Art
 2010 - Lifetime Achievement Award, Israeli Ministry of Culture

References

External links 
 Tsibi Geva Website https://www.tsibigeva.com/about
 Artsy 
 School of Visual Arts 
 WM | whitehot magazine of contemporary art 
 Announcements - e-flux 

Israeli artists
1951 births
Living people